League tables for teams participating in Nelonen, the fifth tier in the Finnish Soccer League system, in 2009.

2009 League tables

Helsinki

Section 1

Section 2

Play-offs
 HDS/Mondial (Section 1/II)   MPS/Atletico Malmi (Section 2/II)  3-3 (1-1) pens 4-5
 FC POHU (Section 1/I)        Zenith (Section 2/I)               1-2 (1-1)

Uusimaa

Section 1

Section 2

South-East Finland (Kaakkois-Suomi)

Eastern Finland (Itä-Suomi)

Section A

Section B

Section Winners play-offs

Central Finland (Keski-Suomi)

Northern Finland (Pohjois-Suomi)

Oulu

Lapland (Lappi)

Central Ostrobothnia (Keski-Pohjanmaa)

Vaasa

Satakunta

Tampere

Turku and Åland (Turku and Ahvenanmaa)

Footnotes

References and sources
Finnish FA
ResultCode

Nelonen (football) seasons
5
Finland
Finland